Gari Soaking is popular Ghanaian dessert made with gari (a powdery food material flour made from the tuberous roots of a cassava plant). As the name implies, it is made by soaking the gari in water or milk.

Ingredients 

 Gari
 Sugar
 Water
 Groundnut 
 Milk

References 

African cuisine
Ghanaian cuisine